William Sullivan Gosling (19 July 1869 – 2 October 1952) was a British Army officer and football player who competed in the 1900 Olympic Games.

Biography
Gosling was the younger brother of Robert Gosling, both were educated at Eton College and were members of a wealthy Essex family. He was commissioned a Second lieutenant in the Scots Guards on 4 March 1891, was promoted Lieutenant on 5 February 1896, and Captain on 7 October 1899. He served twice in the Second Boer War, with the 1st Battalion 1899–1900, when he took part in the march to Bloemfontein in March 1900; and secondly in 1902 when he was in command of reinforcements of 250 officers and men of the 3rd Battalion leaving Southampton in the transport Dilwara 15 April 1902 to arrive in South Africa the following month. He was invalided home after contracting typhoid fever and after the war resigned his commission from the Scots Guards in 1903 when he transferred to the Essex Yeomanry, from which in turn he resigned in 1912.

At the 1911 census he was living at Lovells Court, Marnhull, Dorset. In about the same year he purchased Marton Hall near Myddle, Shropshire and was living there until he returned to Essex although he owned the hall until his death. In World War I he returned to serve with the 3rd Battalion of the Scots Guards and was mainly stationed at their depot in Wellington Barracks, London although he was on duty for ten days in France in January 1917. He was demobilised in May 1919 with rank of major.

Upon his brother's death in 1922, he took over at the family's Hassiobury Farm estate near Bishops Stortford. He was appointed J.P. in 1923, High Sheriff in 1927 and deputy lieutenant (D.L.) in 1929 for the county of Essex.

Gosling married, on 12 November 1903, Lady Victoria Alexandrina Alberta Kerr, fifth daughter of Schomberg Kerr, 9th Marquess of Lothian and a god-daughter of Queen Victoria, and by her had four sons.

Football career
Gosling was a regular full-back for Old Etonians, Casuals and Chelmsford and had appeared in a representative match for London against Sheffield in 1892. In the 1900 Paris Olympics, during an interval between his periods of service in South Africa, he won a gold medal as a member of Upton Park club team picked to represent Great Britain, although an injury during the games put him off the field for part of the Olympics.

References

External links

 

1869 births
1952 deaths
People from Bishop's Stortford
People educated at Eton College
English footballers
English Olympic medallists
Olympic gold medallists for Great Britain
Olympic footballers of Great Britain
Footballers at the 1900 Summer Olympics
Olympic medalists in football
Medalists at the 1900 Summer Olympics
Association football defenders
Chelmsford City F.C. players
Casuals F.C. players
Upton Park F.C. players
Essex Yeomanry officers
Scots Guards officers
British Army personnel of the Second Boer War
British Army personnel of World War I